Marlise Keith (born 9 June 1972) is a South African artist working in ink, pencil and acrylics on canvas, board and glass (reverse glass painting). Her works can be found in a number of international collections in South Africa, America, Britain, Germany, Portugal and Sweden. She worked as an art teacher at Rustenburg High School for Girls in Cape Town until 2003.

Works 
Keith's work is influenced by people, her surroundings and aspects of her personal life. Dreams play an important role in many works, where she captures often disturbing but mostly surreal moments in small, detailed areas of her larger works. It is important to examine her works in great detail to see images receding into the surface and to fully enjoy the complexity and whimsical nature of her illustrative style. Keith has exhibited widely and her works are to be found in collections all around the world.

Awards 

Winner of the Vuleka Art Competition 2006

Team Sanity, 140 x 100 cm, Mixed media on board, 2006

Selected for the Absa Atelier 2006

Shows 
Elysian Fields at UCA Gallery in Cape Town, South Africa 2009

References

Doring Doilies at the AVA by Evie Franzidis
Saar Maritz, Liza Grobler and Marlise Keith at DC Art
'BLOOT' – GROUP EXHIBITION

External links
Marlise Keith Homepage
Worldart

Living people
1972 births
20th-century South African women artists
21st-century South African women artists